Centennial Library may refer to
 Stanley A. Milner Library
 Centennial Library (Cedarville University)